Michael Reilly Burke (born June 27, 1964) is an American actor. He played Rex Van De Kamp on the unaired pilot of Desperate Housewives. Steven Culp replaced him before the pilot aired. He also appeared in The WB series Charmed in the episode "Heartbreak City". He is a 1982 graduate of Marin Catholic High School in Marin County, California.

The lone starring role of his career has been as serial killer Ted Bundy in the 2002 film Ted Bundy. He played the role of Officer Kevin Lund on ABC Family's Lincoln Heights. He has guest starred on various Star Trek series and CSIs.

Filmography

Star Trek: The Next Generation (1993) (1 episode)
Melrose Place (1993) (1 episode)
Picket Fences (1993) (1 episode)
Red Shoe Diaries (1994) (1 episode)
seaQuest 2032 (1994) (1 episode)
Star Trek: Deep Space Nine (1994) (1 episode)
Foreign Student (1994)
Vanishing Son (1995) (1 episode)
Earth 2 (1995) (1 episode)
Terror in the Shadows (1995)
Space: Above and Beyond (1995-1996) (2 episodes)
NYPD Blue (1995-2003) (5 episodes)
Diagnosis: Murder (1996) (1 episode)
Bermuda Triangle (1996)
Central Park West (1996) (3 episodes)
Love Always (1996)
Mars Attacks! (1996)
Childhood Sweetheart? (1997)
Orleans (1997) (6 episodes)
Promised Land (1997) (1 episode)
Beverly Hills, 90210 (1998) (4 episodes)
Creature (1998)
The Pretender (1998) (1 episode)
Ally McBeal (1998) (1 episode)
Party of Five (1999) (1 episode)
Poltergeist: The Legacy (1999) (2 episodes)
Providence (1999) (6 episodes)
Charmed (2000) (1 episode)
Family Law (2000) (1 episode)
First Years (2001) (1 episode)
The Beast (2001) (4 episodes)
Dead Last (2001) (1 episode)
Octopus 2: River of Fear (2001)
JAG (2001-2004) (2 episodes)
For the People (2002) (1 episode)
Ted Bundy (2002) as Ted Bundy
Presidio Med (2002) (1 episode)
War Stories (2003)
Cold Case (2003) (1 episode)
The O.C. (2004) (1 episode)
The Practice (2004) (3 episodes)
CSI: Crime Scene Investigation (2004) (1 episode)
Star Trek: Enterprise (2004) (3 episodes)
NYPD 2069 (2004)
Crossing Jordan (2005) (1 episode)
The West Wing (2005) (1 episode)
Tru Calling (2005) (1 episode)
NCIS (2005) (1 episode)
Without a Trace (2006) (1 episode)
Death of a President (2006)
CSI: Miami (2006) (1 episode)
Heroes (2006) (1 episode)
Company Man (2007)
Close to Home (2007) (1 episode)
24 (2007) (3 episodes)
Shark (2007) (1 episode)
Ghost Whisperer (2007) (1 episode)
The Cure (2007)
The Frolic (2007)
Lincoln Heights (2007-2008)
Eli Stone (2009) (1 episode)
Castle (2009) (1 episode)
ER (2009) (1 episode)
The Collector (2009)
Melrose Place (2009) (1 episode)
The Forgotten (2009) (1 episode)
CSI: NY (2009) (1 episode)
NCIS: Los Angeles (2009) (1 episode)
Private Practice (2010) (3 episodes)
Undercovers (2010) (1 episode)
Criminal Minds (2010) (1 episode)
Memphis Beat (2011) (1 episode)
Drop Dead Diva (2011) (1 episode)
Prime Suspect (2011) (2 episodes)
Rizzoli & Isles (2011) (1 episode)
The Mentalist (2012) (1 episode)
Hawaii Five-0 (2012) (1 episode)
Breakout Kings (2012) (1 episode)
Revenge (2012) (3 episodes)
The Vampire Diaries (2012) (2 episodes)
Vegas (2012-2013)
Grey's Anatomy (2013) (1 episode)
Burn Notice (2013) (1 episode)
Satisfaction (2014) (2 episodes)
The Big Bad City (2014)
Backstrom (2015) (1 episode)
Shameless (2015) (4 episodes)
Suits (2015) (1 episode)
My All American (2015)
Lethal Weapon (2018) (1 episode)
Monster Party (2018)
Slender Man (2018)
Vice (2018)
You (TV series) (2019)

The Passage (2019) (1 episode)

 The Rookie (TV series) (2021) (1 episode)
 The Company You Keep (TV series) (2023) (1 episode)

References

External links

1964 births
20th-century American male actors
21st-century American male actors
American male film actors
American male television actors
Male actors from California
People from San Anselmo, California
People from Los Angeles
Living people